Caloptilia soyella is a moth of the family Gracillariidae. It is known from Cape Verde, China, Fiji, India, Indonesia (Java), Japan (Kyūshū, Honshū, Shikoku), Sri Lanka and Vietnam.

The wingspan is 9–10.2 mm.

The larvae feed on Cajanus cajan, Dolichos species, Glycine max, Kummerovia striana, Lespedeza cyrtobotrya, Phaseolus calcaratus, Phaseolus mungo, Pueraria candollei, Soya hispida, Vigna angularis, Vigna mungo and Vigna umbellata. They mine the leaves of their host plant.

References

soyella
Moths of Cape Verde
Moths of Asia
Moths of Fiji
Moths of Indonesia
Moths of Japan
Moths of Sri Lanka
Moths described in 1904
Moths of Africa